The René Guyon Society was an American organization that advocated sexual relationships with children. Most investigators considered it a one-man propaganda operation. It was named after René Guyon, a former judge who served on the Supreme Court of Thailand for 30 years and who, apart from traditional judicial work, wrote on sexual ethics in his work The Ethics of Sexual Acts.

The entity's motto is said to have been "sex before eight, or else it's too late." According to some sources, it was based in Beverly Hills, California.

The René Guyon Society has been identified, along with the North American Man/Boy Love Association, as an organization "challenging the assertion that sexual abuse is bad because of its effects on children."

It has been defunct since the mid-1980s.

See also
 Pro-pedophile activism

References

Organizations based in the United States
Pedophile advocacy